Mark Christopher Lawrence (born May 22, 1964) is an American character actor, stand-up comedian and voice-over artist. He is known for his role as esoteric D.J. Tone Def in the 1994 satirical rap mockumentary Fear of a Black Hat. He has appeared in popular films such as Terminator 2: Judgment Day, Tales From the Hood, Planet of the Apes, Lost Treasure and The Pursuit of Happyness.

Lawrence is best known for his role as Big Mike on the NBC series Chuck. He has made guest appearances on many television programs, most notably Heroes, My Name Is Earl, Crossing Jordan, Dharma & Greg, Malcolm in the Middle, Touched by an Angel, Malcolm & Eddie, Men Behaving Badly, Seinfeld, Murphy Brown, Good Luck Charlie and Martin. He is also featured on the radio series Adventures in Odyssey as "Ed Washington".

Early life and education
Lawrence grew up in Compton, California. He and his two siblings were raised by a single mother. In tenth grade, he became involved with his high school's debate team—immersing himself in forensics competitions and theater. After winning his school district's Literary Olympiad competition, Lawrence went on to compete at the state and national levels as a member of the Cerritos Community College forensics squad. There he went on to capture the collegiate Bovero-Tabor Award, awarded to the top community college speaker in the country. Lawrence gained the attention of the University of Southern California’s debate team coaches, and was awarded a full scholarship to attend the university. While at USC, he traveled the nation competing in tournaments. Meanwhile, he was gaining valuable experience in his craft by moonlighting at the Los Angeles Theater Center. There, a Hollywood talent agent noticed his skill and landed Lawrence his first job in television, a role on Hill Street Blues.

After graduation from USC, he worked with the San Francisco Mime Troupe while also performing standup comedy throughout the United States, Australia, and Canada, opening for major acts, such as Jerry Seinfeld and Rodney Dangerfield. Lawrence's work in live theater led to a Dramalogue Award for his performance in Reza Abdoh’s, Minimanta. He won an NAACP award for his work in Ken Davis' The Glass House in 1990. It was this role which attracted the attention of director, James Cameron, who then cast him as the "burly insane asylum attendant" in  Terminator 2: Judgment Day.

Filmography

Film

Television

References

External links

Official website
 

 

1964 births
African-American male actors
African-American male comedians
American male comedians
American male film actors
American male television actors
Male actors from Los Angeles County, California
Living people
People from Compton, California
University of Southern California alumni
Comedians from California
21st-century American comedians
21st-century African-American people
20th-century African-American people